Shibin Francis (born 1987)  is an Indian screenwriter. Shibin is the story writer of the Malayalam movie Paavada (2016). He is based in Chicago.

Early life and background
He was born in Poovathodu village near Bharananganam Pala Kottayam, Kerala. He completed his schooling in Kottayam and moved to the United States with his parents. He is settled in Chicago currently and lives with his wife  Dr.Sweta.

Career
Shibin debuted in Malayalam films as a screenwriter for the Malayalam feature film starring Prithviraj Sukumaran, Anoop Menon and Manju Warrier named Paavada. This film was produced by noted film actor Maniyanpilla Raju and is directed by Marthandan. The film was released in January 2016.

He has signed up for Amal Neerad Productions as screenwriter for Amal Neerad's first film with Dulquer Salmaan in the lead. This film was released on 5 May 2017.

Filmography

References

External links
 

1987 births
Living people
Malayalam screenwriters